The 1942 North East Derbyshire by-election was a by-election held for the British House of Commons constituency of North East Derbyshire on 2 February 1942.  The seat had become vacant on the death in December 1941 of the Labour Member of Parliament Frank Lee.

The Labour candidate, Henry White, was returned unopposed.  He represented the constituency until he retired from the House of Commons at the 1959 general election.

See also
 North East Derbyshire (UK Parliament constituency)
 List of United Kingdom by-elections

References

1942 elections in the United Kingdom
1942 in England
By-elections to the Parliament of the United Kingdom in Derbyshire constituencies
Unopposed by-elections to the Parliament of the United Kingdom (need citation)
1940s in Derbyshire